"Wine, Women and Song" is a song written by Betty Sue Perry that was originally recorded by American country artist Loretta Lynn. It was released as a single in April 1964 via Decca Records.

Background and reception 
"Wine, Women and Song" was recorded at the Columbia Recording Studio on February 26, 1964. Located in Nashville, Tennessee, the session was produced by renowned country music producer Owen Bradley. Three additional tracks were recorded during this session, including the single's B-side, "This Haunted House".

"Wine, Women and Song" reached number three on the Billboard Hot Country Singles survey in 1963. The song became her third top ten single under the Decca recording label. "Wine, Women and Song" was Lynn's biggest hit single up until this point in 1964. It was included on her second studio album, Before I'm Over You (1964).

Track listings 
7" vinyl single
 "Wine, Women and Song" – 2:02
 "This Haunted House" – 2:23

Charts

Weekly charts

References 

1963 songs
1963 singles
Decca Records singles
Loretta Lynn songs
Song recordings produced by Owen Bradley
Songs written by Betty Sue Perry